William de Blosseville, probably from Blosseville, was the consul and duke of Gaeta (as William II) from 1103 to 1105, after ousting Duke Gualganus. He appears on Gaetan follari of his time as DV, which stands for dux Vilelmus. In 1105, he was exiled by Richard I of Aquila after less than two years as duke.

Sources
Chronology of the ipati, consuls, dukes, princes, kings, and emperors who governed Gaeta from the 9th to the 13th Century.
The Coins of Gaeta.
Gregorovius, Ferdinand. Rome in the Middle Ages Vol. IV Part 1. 1905.

Italo-Normans
Norman warriors
12th-century Italian nobility
Dukes of Gaeta